Tom P.H. Adams (born 1972) is a Swedish-American technology executive.

Early life and education

Adams grew up in Sweden and France before moving to the United Kingdom at the age of 10 with his parents. He learned both French and English through language immersion, which inspired an early passion for language learning and cross-culture communication. He holds a B.A. with honors from the University of Bristol, United Kingdom and an M.B.A. from INSEAD in Fontainebleau, France.

Career

In his twenties, Adams worked as a commodities trader of copper at Trafigura, which brought him to live in Mongolia for six years, and to travel to the Philippines, China, Slovakia and D.R. Congo. He also lived in Switzerland and China before moving to Harrisonburg, Virginia in the United States in 2003.

After graduating from business school, Adams met the leaders of Rosetta Stone (then Fairfield & Sons Ltd.) and in February 2003 became chief executive of the company. The company went public in 2009, and left the company for hedge fund Bridgewater Associates in 2013.

Adams won an Ernst & Young Entrepreneur of the Year Award in 2009.

He was the president and founder of Workaround, a tech incubator based in Washington, D.C.; co-founder and chairman of Pedago, an educational technology company; and founder and chairman of the board of Bizy, a business management technology company.

Adams is a key figure in the creation of Quantic School of Business and Technology, based in Washington, D.C., USA.

References

1972 births
Living people
American people of Swedish descent
American technology chief executives
American technology company founders